Onion Creek Bridge may refer to:
Onion Creek Bridge, the former name of the bridge in the Moore's Crossing Historic District, in rural Travis County, Texas, nine miles southeast of Austin, Texas
Onion Creek Bridge (Coffeyville, Kansas), listed on the National Register of Historic Places in Montgomery County, Kansas